Ricardo Echeverría (31 May 1918 – 15 August 1970) was a Chilean equestrian and Olympic medalist. He won a silver medal in show jumping at the 1952 Summer Olympics in Helsinki.

References

External links

1918 births
1970 deaths
Chilean male equestrians
Olympic equestrians of Chile
Olympic silver medalists for Chile
Equestrians at the 1952 Summer Olympics
Olympic medalists in equestrian
Medalists at the 1952 Summer Olympics
Pan American Games medalists in equestrian
Pan American Games gold medalists for Chile
Pan American Games bronze medalists for Chile
Equestrians at the 1951 Pan American Games
Medalists at the 1951 Pan American Games
20th-century Chilean people